James Philip O'Connolly (23 February 1926, in Birmingham – December 1986, in Hythe) was an English actor, director, producer and screenwriter. He is best known as the associate producer of many of the Edgar Wallace Mysteries b-films made at Merton Park Studios in the early 1960s, though he also directed a number of other low budget British movies, including The Hi-Jackers (1963), Smokescreen (1964), and Tower of Evil (1972), as well as several episodes of The Saint.

Credits

The Astonished Heart (1950) - 3rd AD
Trio (1950) - assistant director
The Lavender Hill Mob (1951) - 3rd AD
The Man in the White Suit (1951) - 3rd AD
Secret People (1952) - 3rd AD
Mandy (1952) - assistant director
I Believe in You (1952) - 3rd AD
The Gentle Gunman (1952) - 2nd AD
Laxdale Hall (1953) - 2nd AD
Personal Affair (1953) - 2nd unit director
The Blazing Caravan (1954) (short) - production assistant
The Dark Stairway (1954) (short) - production assistant
Passenger to Tokyo (1954) (short) - production assistant
The Diamond Wizard (1954) aka The Diamond - associate producer, assistant director
Child's Play (1954) -2nd AD
The Brain Machine (1955) - 1st AD
The Strange Case of Blondie (1955) (short) - production assistant
Night Plane to Amsterdam (1955) (short) - production assistant
The Love Match (1955) -assistant director
Little Red Monkey  (1955) - production manager
The Deadliest Sin (1955) aka Confession - production manager
The Atomic Man (1955) aka Timeslip - production manager
Murder Anonymous (1955) (short) - production manager
Dial 999 (1955) - production manager
The Wall of Death (1956) (short) - production manager
The Case of the River Morgue (1956) (short) - production manager
Destination Death (1956) (short) - production manager
Persons Unknown (1956) (short) - production manager
The Intimate Stranger (1956) aka Finger of Guilt - production manager
The Counterfeit Plan (1957) - production manager
The Lonely House (1957) (short) - production manager
Bullet from the Past (1957) (short) - production manager
Inside Information (1957) (short) - production manager
Scotland Yard Dragnet (1957) aka The Hypnotist - production manager
The Case of The Smiling Widow (1957) (short) - production manager
Man in the Shadow (1957) - production manager
The Mail Van Murder (1957) (short) - production manager
The White Cliffs Mystery (1957) (short) - associate producer
The Tyburn Case (1957) (short) - associate producer
Night Crossing (1957) (short) - associate producer
Escapement (1958) aka The Electronic Magnet - associate producer
The Strange Awakening (1958) aka Female Fiends - associate producer
Print of Death (1958) (short) - associate producer
The Cross-Road Gallows (1958) (short) - associate producer
Crime of Honour (1958) (short) - associate producer
The Unseeing Eye (1959) (short) - production manager
Horrors of the Black Museum (1959) - production manager
The Ghost Train Murder (1959) (short) - associate producer
The Dover Road Mystery (1960) (short) - associate producer
The Edgar Wallace Mystery Theatre (1959–62) - associate producer
Urge to Kill (1960) - associate producer
The Last Train (1960) (short) - associate producer
Concrete Jungle (1960) aka The Criminal - associate producer
The Man Who Was Nobody (1960) - associate producer
Marriage of Convenience (1960) - associate producer
Evidence in Concrete (1960) (short) -associate producer
Clue of the Twisted Candle (1960) - associate producer
The Silent Weapon (1961) (short) - associate producer
The Grand Junction Case (1961) (short) - associate producer
Konga (1961) - associate producer
The Clue of the New Pin (1961) - associate producer
Wings of Death (1961) (short) - associate producer
The Square Mile Murder (1961) (short) - associate producer
 Man at the Carlton Tower (1961)
 Partners in Crime (1961)
The Never Never Murder (1961) (short) - associate producer
The Fourth Square (1961) - associate producer
Never Back Losers (1961) - associate producer
Man Detained (1961) - associate producer
Clue of the Silver Key (1961) - associate producer
Attempt to Kill (1961) - associate producer
The Sinister Man (1961) - associate producer
Candidate for Murder (1962) - associate producer
Emergency (1962) - writer
The Traitors (1962) - writer, producer
Flat Two (1962) - associate producer
Backfire! (1962) - associate producer
Shadow of Fear (1954) - writer
The Hi-Jackers (1963) - writer, director
Farewell Performance (1963) - writer, producer
Gideon C.I.D. (1964) (TV series) - writer
Smokescreen (1964) - writer, director
The Little Ones (1965) - writer, director
The Night Caller (1965) - writer
A Study in Terror (1965) - original story
Berserk! (1967) - director
The Saint (1967) (TV series) - director
Vendetta for the Saint (1969) - director
Crooks and Coronets (1969) - writer, director
The Valley of Gwangi (1969) - director
Tower of Evil (1972) - writer, director
Mistress Pamela (1974) - writer, producer, director

References

External links
Jim O'Connolly at BFI
Jim O'Connolly at TCMDB
Jim O'Connolly at Letterbox DVD
Jim O'Connolly at BFI

1926 births
1986 deaths
20th-century English male actors
English male film actors
English film directors
English film producers
English male screenwriters
English people of Irish descent
Date of death missing
20th-century English screenwriters
20th-century English male writers
20th-century English businesspeople